Meeniyan is a small country town on the South Gippsland Highway between Leongatha and Foster in Australia. As of 2016 it has a population of 771.

History

The Post Office opened on 16 August 1890 shortly before the railway arrived.

The Meeniyan Magistrates' Court closed on 1 January 1983, not having been visited by a Magistrate since 1971.

The town today
The town centre is marked by a wide tree-lined median strip  and a number of craft, gift and food shops along both sides. Trulli Woodfire Pizzeria, Moos Cafe, Pandesal Bakery and the Meeniyan Pantry Store and Cellar are big foodie draw cards for the town. The annual Meeniyan Garlic Festival (started by Kirsten and David Jones of multi award winning Mirboo Farm) brings over seven thousand produce enthusiasts into the town in mid February. The town also has a golf course, the Meeniyan Golf Club on Buffalo Road. Music is a big part of local life in the Meeniyan Hall: Lyrebird Arts presents international touring artists and the Tavern talent nights are held every couple of  months.

Meeniyan is also now known for the filming of Bed of Roses a mini-series on ABC1.

Meeniyan Dumbalk United (MDU) Football Club is the local Australian Rules football team that competes in the Alberton Football League. The team is shared with neighbouring township Dumbalk. The Meeniyan Recreation Reserve is the MDU FC home ground.

See also
Meeniyan railway station

References

External links
Promaccom
Meeniyan Website

Towns in Victoria (Australia)
Shire of South Gippsland